Puran is a sub-division and tehsil of Shangla District in Khyber-Pakhtunkhwa province of Pakistan. The subdivision includes three tehsils viz: Puran itself, Martung and Makhuzai. Puran Sub-division comprises nine Union Councils.

Villages and settlements
Puran includes the following villages and towns

Aloch
Nimkalay
Bengalai
Sandovi
Sanila
Kotkay

Notable people 
People from Puran include:-

 Fazlullah
 Ibadullah Khan
 Pir Muhammad Khan
 Amir Muqam
 Abdul Munim

References

 "Abdul Munim". kpktribune.com. Archived from the original on 6 December 2017. Retrieved 5 December 2017.

 .  General Elections 2008 Report Vol. II -- Government of Pakistan page 322 [2]
3. Fazlullah MPA 
 http://www.puran.20m.com/

External links
 pakp.gov.pk

Populated places in Shangla District
Tehsils of Khyber Pakhtunkhwa